, real name  was a sumo wrestler from Ino, Agawa District, Kōchi Prefecture, Japan. His highest rank was sekiwake. After his retirement in 1981 he became a television personality and ran unsuccessfully for political office.

Career
His parents were farmers. He began sumo at Kochi junior high school. He was an amateur sumo champion at Nihon University, coming third in the All Japan Sumo Tournament in his third year. He made his professional debut in 1972, beginning as a makushita tsukedashi entrant,  and reached the top makuuchi division the following year.  He was a member of Hanakago stable and a stablemate of yokozuna Wajima, a fellow Nihon University graduate. He once wore a cream-coloured mawashi, or belt, in a tournament, the only wrestler so far to do so. He fought under his family name of Arase, although he changed the second part of it from Hideo to Nagahide in 1975. He was involved in an unusual incident when in a match against Tamanofuji the referee was knocked out of the dohyo having failed to get out of the wrestlers’ way, and had to be told who was the winner. He fought in the top division for 48 tournaments, with  a win/loss record of 351-367-2. He won four sansho or special prizes and two kinboshi or gold stars. He defeated yokozuna Kitanoumi in January 1980 having previously lost to him 27 times in a row (the second worst record ever for a wrestler against the same opponent, after Kaneshiro who lost 29 consecutive bouts to Kitanoumi). In a match against Wakamisugi on the 8th day of the July 1976 tournament there were eight matta or false starts, and both wrestlers were criticized by the chief judge. Arase had a reputation for regularly engaging in false starts, and there was a suggestion from the sansho committee when he was up for the Fighting Spirit Award in March 1975 that this should disqualify him from receiving the prize, although he was given it in the end. He held the third highest rank of sekiwake for nine tournaments in total, including four straight from September 1977 to March 1978. However he only once had a double-digit winning record at the rank and so never seriously challenged for ozeki promotion. Hampered by a right knee injury, he announced his retirement in September 1981.

Retirement from sumo
After his retirement he was briefly an elder of the Japan Sumo Association under the name of Magaki but left in February 1983, turning the name over to Wakanohana II, and became a television personality. He stood for election to the House of Councillors as a Liberal League candidate in 2001, but was unsuccessful. He suffered a stroke in 2006. He died of heart failure in 2008 at the age of 59.

Fighting style
He was a yotsu-sumo (grappling) wrestler who preferred the migi-yotsu (right hand inside, left hand outside) position on the mawashi. He employed the gaburi-yori technique of pushing with the stomach while grabbing the mawashi, a style also associated with Kotoshogiku.

Career record

See also
List of past sumo wrestlers
List of sekiwake

References

1949 births
2008 deaths
Japanese sumo wrestlers
Nihon University alumni
Sumo people from Kōchi Prefecture
Sumo wrestlers who use their birth name
Sekiwake